The RL class are a class of diesel locomotives built by Rail Technical Support Group (RTS) for the National Railway Equipment Company at Islington Railway Workshops in Australia.

History
The concept of the RL class dates back to 1994 when Morrison Knudsen Australia purchased some 442 class locomotives from the State Rail Authority with the aim of rebuilding them with EMD 16 645F3B engines. However the project was shelved and the locomotives scrapped.

Following National Railway Equipment Company purchasing Morrison Knudsen, the project was revitalised albeit using new locomotive frames. Nine were built by RTS at Islington Railway Workshops, Adelaide between 2005 and 2010 with bogies and compressors from the 442s and reconditioned parts from the United States.

Seven were originally built and initially owned by Chicago Freight Car Leasing Australia before being sold to Greentrains and leased to South Spur Rail Services. One was included in the sale of the South Spur Rail Services business to Qube Logistics in May 2010 who later took delivery of a further two. A tenth was not completed after a defect was discovered in the frame and scrapped.

They have hauled freight services in New South Wales, Victoria and South Australia. In April 2016, the six Greentrains units were sold to Southern Shorthaul Railroad.

Status table

References

External links
Flickr gallery

Co-Co locomotives
Diesel-electric locomotives of Australia
Railway locomotives introduced in 2005
Standard gauge locomotives of Australia
NRE locomotives